Jhal Thikriwala  is a village in Kapurthala district of Punjab State, India. The village is administrated by a Sarpanch, who is an elected representative.

Demography 
According to the report published by Census India in 2011, Jhal Thikriwala has 234 houses with the total population of 1,138 persons of which 601 are male and 537 females. Literacy rate of  Jhal Thikriwala is 72.86%, lower than the state average of 75.84%.  The population of children in the age group 0–6 years is 169 which is 14.85% of the total population.  Child sex ratio is approximately 920, higher than the state average of 846.

Population data

References

External links
  Villages in Kapurthala
 Kapurthala Villages List

Villages in Kapurthala district